Kee en Janus naar Parijs is a 1924 Dutch silent comedy film directed by Alex Benno.

Cast
 Alie Blanket
 Rafael Bouwmeester - (as Rafaël Bouwmeester)
 Hans Bruning
 Beppie De Vries
 Johan Elsensohn - Hein Brommerd alias de Jatter
 Piet Köhler - Janus Meiblom
 Frans Meermans
 Jan Nooy - Rinus Kous
 Louis Richard - Kees, Kee Mols zoon
 Adrienne Solser - Kee Mol
 André van Dijk
 Kees Weerdenburg - Gerrit de Slome
 Cor Weerdenburg-Smit - Griet, Gerrits vrouw
 Sophie Willemse - Kee, Kee Mols dochter
 Geertruida Zonneveld - Bruidsmeisje

See also
 Kee en Janus naar Berlijn (1923)

External links 
 

1924 films
Dutch silent feature films
Dutch black-and-white films
1924 comedy films
Films directed by Alex Benno
Dutch comedy films
Silent comedy films
1920s Dutch-language films